The governor of the Department of Quindío heads the executive branch of the government of the Colombian department of Quindío and is Commander-in-Chief of the department’s police forces. The governor is the highest-ranking official in the department, serving as the main agent for the president of Colombia to carry on the task of maintaining public order and the execution of the general economic policy, and all matters of law passed down for the nation. The current governor is Julio Cesar López Espinosa.

References

External sources
Quindio Government website

Quindio
Quindío Department